Knockbody is a townland in County Westmeath, Ireland.

Knockbody is one of 11 townlands of the civil parish of Stonehall in the barony of Corkaree in the Province of Leinster.

The neighbouring townlands are: Monintown to the north, Martinstown to the south, Blackmiles to the south–west and Stonehall to the west. Knockbody borders the southern end of Lough Derravaragh.

In the 1911 census of Ireland there were 3 houses and 22 inhabitants in the townland.

References

External links
Map of Knockbody at openstreetmap.org
Knockbody at the IreAtlas Townland Data Base
Knockbody at Townlands.ie
Knockbody at The Placenames Database of Ireland

Townlands of County Westmeath